The Church of St. Stephen is a historic Roman Catholic church building in St. Stephen, Minnesota, United States.  It is part of the Roman Catholic Diocese of Saint Cloud.  The church was constructed in 1903 in a rural community settled by Slovene immigrants.  An 1890 rectory stands behind the church.  Both buildings were listed on the National Register of Historic Places in 1982 for their state-level significance in the themes of architecture, exploration/settlement, and religion.  The property was nominated for reflecting the settlement of rural Stearns County by Catholic immigrant groups clustered in small, ethnic hamlets dominated by a central church.

See also
 List of Catholic churches in the United States
 National Register of Historic Places listings in Stearns County, Minnesota

References

External links

 The Catholic Communities of Opole ● St. Stephen ● St. Wendel

1903 establishments in Minnesota
Churches in Stearns County, Minnesota
Churches in the Roman Catholic Diocese of Saint Cloud
National Register of Historic Places in Stearns County, Minnesota
Roman Catholic churches completed in 1903
Churches on the National Register of Historic Places in Minnesota
Romanesque Revival church buildings in Minnesota
Slovene-American culture in Minnesota
20th-century Roman Catholic church buildings in the United States